Disney Channel is a European-managed pay television kids channel originally owned and operated by The Walt Disney Company Limited. It is available through the Middle East (except Iran, Israel, Syria, and Turkey), North Africa, Sub-Saharan Africa, Greece, Cyprus, and most of the Balkans (excluding Albania, Bulgaria, Romania and Moldova).

It was originally launched on 2 April 1997 as a channel in the Middle East & North Africa; exclusively for Orbit TV subscribers (now OSN). And in 2006, it began expanding to markets in Sub-Saharan Africa and the Balkans. The channel previously used to cover Poland and Turkey, with respective audio tracks for the two markets, until 2010 and 2012 respectively when two fully-localized feeds were launched for the two countries. In Albania, the EMEA feed was previously available from 2012 to 2018, with Albanian subtitles available for programs.

History
The Disney Channel began broadcasting on 2 April 1997 on satellite provider Orbit in the Middle East & North Africa region. At first, the channel was only available in English, but on 1 April 1998, a separate Arabic sub-feed was added. Animated films and series were dubbed in Arabic, while live-action films and series were subtitled. Disney Channel Middle East was then picked up by satellite provider Showtime in fall 2001. The channel featured the logos (resembling Mickey Mouse head) in two versions (the one with the channel's name written in English and the other in Arabic for each feed), until June 2003 when it adopted the 2002 US Disney Channel logo.

Somewhere at that time, both the Arabic and English feeds of the channel were merged. In consequence, on 3 January 2005 Disney Channel Middle East started to simulcast Disney Channel Scandinavia, including its schedule and the prints of the series and movies for this feed (which were modified to also include Arabic dubbing credits). Then somewhere between November and December 2005, Disney Channel Scandinavia and Middle East started to add dubbing credits to its programming through subtitles.

Disney Channel Scandinavia and Middle East started gradually becoming individual feeds in 2006, starting with a different rotation of films (that gradually got more different), though this did not stop Arab satellite provider Orbit from adding a Swedish audio track to the Middle Eastern feed on 16 April 2007 (which was subsequently removed years later).

The Middle Eastern feed became a pan-regional network, as the channel was launched in Sub-Saharan Africa on 25 September 2006, Poland on 2 December 2006, Turkey on 29 April 2007; and Greece along with Cyprus on 8 November 2009.

In September 2009, when the feed separation from Disney Channel Scandinavia was complete, the Middle East feed (now broadcasting in most of the EMEA region) started to share promotions and events with the CEE feed.

On 1 August 2010, the EMEA feed in Poland was separated and replaced with a fully localized Polish feed.

On 12 January 2012, Disney Channel EMEA in Turkey was replaced by an independent Turkish feed, and became a free-to-air network.

Between 2009 and 2012, Disney Channel EMEA began broadcasting in the Serbia, Croatia, Montenegro, North Macedonia, Bosnia & Herzegovina, Slovenia, and Albania.

The channel adopted a new logo and underwent a rebrand on 21 July 2014. In 2015, Disney Channel EMEA switched its aspect ratio from 4:3 to 16:9.

In 2017, a high-definition feed of the channel was launched. It includes Arabic subtitles for live-action films and TV series. Also in that year, Disney Channel EMEA rebranded using the 2017 European branding package. And on 2018, the Albanian transmission ceased.

Disney Channel programs are currently available on Disney+, which was launched in South Africa on 18 May 2022, the Arab countries on 8 June 2022; and Eastern Europe on 14 June 2022, concluding Europe's launch.

On 24 June 2022, Disney Channel EMEA, Israel, Spain and Portugal rebranded with a new graphics, with the customized wordmark logo; designed by Flopicco from Rome, Italy.

Availability

Middle East and North Africa 
The Middle East sub-feed is the oldest sub-feed, and began broadcasting in the Middle East and North Africa on 2 April 1997. The feed is currently available in both English and Arabic. The vast majority of all animated series can be watched with Arabic dubbing, but live-action programs are almost always aired in English only with Arabic subtitles instead. It also have a website in both English and Arabic versions.

Sub-Saharan Africa 
Launched on 25 September 2006 on Multichoice's DStv, it went 24 hours since 2007. Broadcasting in most of Sub-Saharan Africa. This feed airs programs in English only, without foreign-language subtitles. It also have a website based from South Africa.

Greece & Cyprus 
Launched in Greece and Cyprus on 8 November 2009 on NOVA. The feed is currently available in both English and Greek. Most programs whether animated are generally dubbed into Greek on this sub-feed, although some programs are aired with live-action Greek subtitles instead. The vast majority of all animated series can be watched with Greek dubbing, but live-action programs are almost always aired in English only with Greek subtitles instead. It also has a website in both English and Greek versions.

Other countries 
Expanded between 2009 and 2012 with multiple distributors through Bosnia & Herzegovina, Croatia, Montenegro, North Macedonia, Serbia (including the disputed Kosovo) and Slovenia. All programs are exclusively aired with English audio, with Serbian, Croatian and Slovene subtitles. In Febuary 28, 2023, the feed launched in the Baltic states (Estonia, Latvia, and Lithuania), replacing the Scandinavian feed; testing in the Baltics begins.

Sister channels

Disney Junior 

Disney Junior is a pan-regional and sister channel; focused on toddlers and preschoolers, aged 2–6 years old. It launched on September 1, 2010, in MENA, Sub-Saharan Africa, Greece & Cyprus as Playhouse Disney. On June 1, 2011, Disney Junior was launched, replacing Playhouse Disney.

On 31 May 2016, Disney Junior was launch in a full Arabic language counterpart; exclusively on OSN.

Disney XD (closed) 
Disney XD was a pan-regional and sister channel; focused on older kids and teenagers (mostly boys). It was launch in the MENA, Greece, Serbia, Bosnia, Montenegro, Croatia, North Macedonia and Slovenia in 2009; and in Sub-Saharan Africa in May 2011.

In South Africa in June 2014, Multichoice fined R5000 (around $300) after failing to provide a warning before airing an advertisement for the fantasy drama series WolfBlood, containing horror scenes on the morning of 31 December 2013.

In 2018, an Arabic language counterpart launched.

The channel was later closed in Sub-Saharan Africa on 1 October 2020; the MENA region and in the Balkans, on 31 December 2020; and Greece on 31 January 2021.

Programming

Current programming
Alex & Co. (3 Seasons)
Amphibia (3 Seasons)
Avengers Assemble (4 Seasons) 
Big City Greens (2 Seasons)
Binny and the Ghost (2 Seasons)
Descendants: Wicked World (2 Seasons)
Bunk'd (4 Seasons)
Disney 11 (3 Seasons)
DuckTales (3 Seasons)
Guardians of the Galaxy (2 Seasons)
The Ghost and Molly McGee (1 Season)
Ghostforce (1 Season)
Gabby Duran & the Unsittables (2 Seasons; 27 July 2020-Present)
Jessie (4 Seasons)
Hannah Montana (4 Seasons)
Lab Rats (3 Seasons)
LoliRock (2 Seasons)
Marvel's Spider-Man (3 Seasons)
Mickey Mouse (5 Seasons)
Miraculous: Tales of Ladybug & Cat Noir (5 Seasons)
Phineas and Ferb (4 Seasons)
Raven's Home (4 Seasons)
The Rocketeer (1 Season) (Originally also on Disney Junior)
Rolling with the Ronks! (1 Season)
Secrets of Sulphur Springs (2 Seasons)
Shake It Up (3 Seasons)
Star Wars Forces of Destiny (2 Seasons)
Stuck in the Middle (3 Seaosns)
Sydney to the Max (3 Season)
Team Sayari
The Evermoor Chronicles (2 Seasons)
The Owl House (2 Seasons)
The Unstoppable Yellow Yeti (1 Season)
The Villains of Valley View (1 Season)
Vikingskool (1 Season)
Ultra Violet & Black Scorpion (1 Season)
Violetta (3 Seasons)
Walk the Prank (3 Seasons)
Wizards of Waverly Place (4 Seasons)
Note: Some programs are available on Disney+.

Former programming
A.N.T. Farm
American Dragon: Jake Long
Austin & Ally
Best Friends Whenever
Bizaardvark
Darkwing Duck
Dog with a Blog
Cookabout
Chip and Dale: Rescue Rangers
Coop & Cami Ask the World 
Cory in the House
Disney Fam Jam
Disney Tsum Tsum
Elena of Avalor (Originally also on Disney Junior)
Even Stevens
Fish Hooks
Gargoyles
Gigantosaurus (Now on Disney Junior)
Girl Meets World
Go Away, Unicorn!
Good Luck Charlie
Gravity Falls
Home Improvement
House of Mouse
Hulk and the Agents of S.M.A.S.H.
I Didn't Do It
Jonas
Just Roll with It
K.C. Undercover
Kim Possible
Kitty is Not a Cat
Legend of the Three Caballeros
Lilo and Stitch: The Series
Liv and Maddie
Lizzie McGuire
Lloyd in Space
Marvel Rising: Secret Warriors
Phil of the Future
Quack Pack
Rapunzel's Tangled Adventure (Originally also on Disney Junior)
Recess
Sabrina: The Animated Series
Sadie Sparks
Sofia the First (Now on Disney Junior)
Soy Luna
Supa Strikas
Sonny with a Chance
So Random!
So Weird
That's So Raven
The Fairly OddParents (Seasons 1-5)
The Suite Life of Zack & Cody
The Suite Life on Deck
The ZhuZhus
Totally Spies!
Ultimate Spider-Man

Upcoming programming
Disney Channel Original Movie premieres

2015Teen Beach Movie (26 June 2015)Descendants (18 September 2015)

2016Adventures in Babysitting (23 September 2016)

2017Descendants 2 (6 October 2017)

2018Zombies (12 May 2018)Freaky Friday (9 November 2018)

2019Kim Possible (3 May 2019)Descendants 3 (11 October 2019)

2020Zombies 2 (8 May 2020)

2021Upside-Down Magic (29 January 2021)Under Wraps (29 October 2021)Spin (12 November 2021)Christmas... Again?! (24 December 2021)

2022Zombies 3'' (14 October 2022)

Notes

References

External links
Official African website
Official Arabic-language MENA website
Official English-language MENA website
Official Greek website
 Disney Africa Channels
 Disney Africa
 Disney Greece
 Disney Channel Africa
 Disney Greece
 Disney MENA

The Walt Disney Company
Europe, the Middle East and Africa
Europe, Middle East and Africa
2004 establishments in Europe
Television channels and stations established in 1997
Television channel articles with incorrect naming style
Television channels in North Macedonia
Children's television channels in North Macedonia
Television stations in Bosnia and Herzegovina
Television channels in Croatia
Television stations in Serbia
Television stations in Montenegro
Television channels in Greece
Television channels in Cyprus
Television stations in the United Arab Emirates
Television stations in Saudi Arabia
Television stations in Egypt
Television channels in Jordan
Television stations in Morocco
Television stations in Libya
Television stations in Lebanon
Television stations in Iraq
Television stations in Algeria
Television stations in Tunisia
Television stations in Kuwait
Television stations in the State of Palestine
Television stations in Yemen
Television stations in South Africa
Television channels in Slovenia